Cycas condaoensis is a species of cycad endemic to the Côn Đảo Islands off the coast of southern Vietnam.

References

https://plantnet.rbgsyd.nsw.gov.au/cgi-bin/cycadpg?taxname=Cycas+condaoensis

condaoensis
Endemic flora of Vietnam
Plants described in 2004